Acerpenna is a genus of mayflies in the family Baetidae. It has at least three species.

Species
Acerpenna akataleptos — (McDunnough, 1926)	
Acerpenna pygmaea, Blue-Winged Olive — (Hagen, 1861)
Acerpenna macdunnoughi — (Ide, 1937)
et al.

Importance
The blue wing olive mayfly is one of the most common aquatic insects in coldwater rivers and is replicated with artificial fly patterns for fly fishing for trout and other species in North America but is less commonly used in Great Britain.  Along with the adams dry fly they are the most popular dry style flies in the United States.

References

 Bugguide.net

Mayfly genera